Anna Renee Todd (born March 20, 1989) is an American author and screenwriter, who is best known for her After series. She started publishing on the social storytelling platform Wattpad. The print edition of the series was published in 2014 by Gallery Books, an imprint of Simon & Schuster, and has been translated into several languages. The film adaptation of the first book was released on April 12, 2019, by Aviron Pictures, the second in September 2020 and third in September 2021.

In 2018, Todd went on to open her own production company, Frayed Pages. In 2021, the company evolved and she announced her own imprint in partnership with Wattpad. Frayed Pages x Wattpad Books will publish the author's future projects, as well as other writers works.

Career
Todd's writing was initially inspired by the music and fandom of One Direction, and the singer Harry Styles is a model for the protagonist in her After series, under the name Hardin Scott. She started by writing stories on her phone with the Wattpad app in 2013, publishing  a chapter almost daily for over a year. Todd wrote three books in the After series on Wattpad.

The series has sometimes been compared to the Fifty Shades trilogy as both series had their start as fan fiction. Reviewers at the website Jezebel criticized the series and stated that it "echoes the troubling dynamics of 50 Shades," as they felt that Hardin's character "behaves at best like a prick, at worst like an abusive boyfriend in the making."

In 2015, Todd announced that she would be publishing Before, a prequel novel that tells the events of After from the perspective of Hardin Scott. Her next book, The Spring Girls, a re-telling of Louisa May Alcott's Little Women, was published in 2018.

In October 2014, Paramount Pictures acquired film rights to the After series with Offspring Entertainment (Step Up franchise, Rock of Ages) set to produce. The film, based on her first book, was eventually released by Aviron Pictures on April 12, 2019. Josephine Langford portrays Tessa, the female protagonist, and Hero Fiennes Tiffin portrays Hardin, the male protagonist.

Frayed Pages Media 
In 2021, Todd started her own imprint in partnership with Wattpad Books. Frayed Pages will publish the author's future novels, as well as other writers' works. The imprint was announced in November 2021 along with the news that After would become a graphic novel, scheduled to be released in May of the next year.

In February 2022, Cosmopolitan announced the release of Todd's new novel to be published under her imprint. The Falling, which is a rewritten version of one of her previous works, The Brightest Stars, tells the story of a young girl named Karina falling in love with Kael, a soldier fighting to overcome PTSD following three deployments in Afghanistan. Two more novels will complete the series: The Burning and The Infinite Light of Dust.

Personal life
Todd grew up in Dayton, Ohio. In 2007, she married her ex-husband Jordan, an American soldier, when she was 18 years old and the two then moved to Fort Hood, Texas, where she worked at a Waffle House and at a makeup counter for ULTA Beauty. She has a son named Asher with her ex-husband. Todd announced their split via Instagram on June 30, 2022. She also has an older brother and younger sister.

Todd briefly shared a mailbox with Austin film critic Korey Coleman. Years later, he would review the film adaptation of her novel After, though he gave it a negative review.

Bibliography

Single novels 

 Imagines: Keeping the Kool (co-written with Kevin Fanning and Kate J. Squires – April 2017)
 The Spring Girls: A Modern-Day Retelling of Little Women (2018)

After series 
After (October 2014)
After We Collided (November 2014)
After We Fell (December 2014)
After Ever Happy (February 2015)
Before (Prequel Novella) (December 2015)

Landon series 
Nothing More (September 2016)
Nothing Less (December 2016)

Stars series 

 The Falling (July 2021)
 The Burning (TBA)
 The Infinite Light of Dust (TBA)

Graphic novels 

 After: The Graphic Novel (Volume One) (May 2022)

References

External links
 
 After on Wattpad
 

1989 births
Living people
American women novelists
21st-century American novelists
21st-century American women writers
Writers from Dayton, Ohio
Novelists from Ohio
Wattpad writers
American women screenwriters
Screenwriters from Ohio
21st-century American screenwriters